Torkuase is a town in the Greater Accra Region of Ghana. The town is known for the Torkuase Secondary School.  The school is a second cycle institution.

References

Ghana towns with Senior High Schools

Populated places in the Greater Accra Region